The Church of All Saints  is an Anglican parish church in Dunkerton Somerset, England. It was built in the 14th century with the tower being added in the 15th and has been designated as a Grade II* listed building.

The church consists of a nave, chancel and west porch. The three-stage tower is supported by diagonal buttresses  and has a stair turret in the north east corner. The stained glass includes work by Clayton and Bell.

In the churchyard is a large yew tree close to the boundary wall.

The parish is part of the benefice of Timsbury with Priston, Camerton and Dunkerton within the archdeaconry of Midsomer Norton.

See also
 List of ecclesiastical parishes in the Diocese of Bath and Wells

References

14th-century church buildings in England
Towers completed in the 15th century
Church of England church buildings in Bath and North East Somerset
Grade II* listed churches in Somerset
Grade II* listed buildings in Bath and North East Somerset